Minuscule 2276 (in the Gregory-Aland numbering), is a Greek minuscule manuscript of the New Testament written on parchment. Palaeographically it has been assigned to the 14th century. Only one leaf of the codex has survived. Gregory catalogued it twice as 815 and 2276.

Description 
The codex contains the text of the Gospel of Matthew (9:32-10:16), on 1 parchment leaf (size ).

The text is written in one column per page, 28 lines per page.
The letters are very small (like in minuscule 80). The large initial letters are written in red.

There is also another division according to the Ammonian Sections, whose numbers are given at the margin, but there is no references to the Eusebian Canons.

It contains lectionary markings and incipits.

Text 
Aland the Greek text of the codex did not place in any Category.
It was not examined by Hermann von Soden.

History 
Gregory dated the manuscript to the 12th century. The manuscript is currently dated by the INTF to the 14th century.

It was held in Corfu and belonged to Earl Gonemi, then it came to "Dawes Collection" (as second volume).

It was added to the list of New Testament manuscripts by Gregory (815e). Gregory saw it in 1886 during his visit in Greece.

In 1904 Gregory saw this manuscript in British Museum and catalogued again under the siglum 2276. The manuscript was bought from C. G. Aspiotis in 1897.

Kurt Aland recognized that sigla 815 and 2276 designated the same manuscript and number 815 was deleted from the list, actually number 2278 is used as siglum for this manuscript.

The manuscript is now housed at the British Library (Add MS 35123, fol. 469) in London.

See also 

 List of New Testament minuscules
 Biblical manuscript
 Textual criticism
 Minuscule 2278

References

Further reading 

 

Greek New Testament minuscules
14th-century biblical manuscripts
British Library additional manuscripts